Ward Thomas are an English modern country-pop duo, composed of twin sisters Catherine and Lizzy Ward Thomas from Hampshire. The band has been called "Britain's first country stars".<ref></ref, their music has been described as written "from a British perspective". While people have been able to appreciate the American sound, they can connect with the themes of British lyrics.</ref> Cartwheels, their second studio album became the first album by a UK country act to reach number one on the UK Albums Chart surpassing the previous record by The Shires. It has since gone gold in the UK.

Early life
Catherine and Lizzy are twins, born two minutes apart, who grew up on a farm in rural Hampshire, England, and were educated at Alton Convent, a local Roman Catholic day school, where they acquired the nicknames "Scruff 1" and "Scruff 2" because they were "so bad at being neat and tidy". Their brother Tom Ward-Thomas is an actor and playwright. Their father is Anthony Ward-Thomas (born 1958), who in 1985 founded his own eponymous removals business now with an annual turnover of £22 million (2015), also an amateur jockey and racehorse owner, Catherine actually rode in a point to point at the age of 16 and both the girls share a passion with their father for horses, Anthony is also the eldest son of the novelist Evelyn Anthony (1926-2018) (Mrs Evelyn Ward-Thomas), High Sheriff of Essex in 1994. Their mother Amanda Ward Thomas is an artist. Catherine Ward Thomas married in May 2022.

Career

2014–2015: From Where We Stand

They co-wrote the songs for their debut album From Where We Stand, which was released on 20 July 2014. It peaked at number 41 on the UK Albums Chart, number 1 on the UK Country Chart, number 7 on the UK Indie Chart and number 36 in Scotland. The album won UK Album of the Year at the British Country Music Awards and sold over 25,000 copies. They have toured the UK multiple times, with shows at venues including Islington Assembly Hall and The New Adelphi Club in Hull, East Yorkshire. In 2014, they performed on the BBC Introducing stage at the BBC Radio 2 Live in Hyde Park festival, returning to the festival in 2015 to perform on the main stage alongside The Shires; a performance which was broadcast live on BBC Radio 2.

2016–2017: Cartwheels and A Shorter Story

In June 2016, Ward Thomas announced a joint venture with Sony Music and that their second album, Cartwheels, would be released in September 2016. Lead single "Carry You Home", described by The Times as "chirpy country pop" was released in June, followed by the singles "Guilty Flowers" and "Cartwheels", all of which were added to the Radio 2 playlist. Cartwheels reached number 1 in the UK Albums Chart, making Ward Thomas the first UK country act to top the charts and officially making them the most successful UK country act. It has since gone gold in the UK. In September 2016, Ward Thomas were confirmed to play at the 31st edition of Eurosonic Noorderslag in Groningen and in March 2017, Ward Thomas were announced as the official opening act for the Country to Country 2017 festival.

On 28 October 2016, Ward Thomas released the single version of "Cartwheels", featuring a cover of Lenny Kravitz's song "Fly Away" which was also featured on the TV show "Countrywise". On 31 March 2017, Ward Thomas released their first EP, A Shorter Story, which features the duo covering five of their favourite songs. In 2017, they supported American country superstar Miranda Lambert on the UK leg of her Highway Vagabond Tour.

2017–present: Restless Minds
In July 2018, Ward Thomas announced that they will release their third album, Restless Minds. The announcement coincided with the release of lead single "Lie Like Me", a biting indictment of lives faked online. During the 2019 C2C: Country to Country festival, the duo were surprised by Cam at the CMA Songwriter's Event with the Jeff Walker Global Achievement Award from the Country Music Association, making them only the second UK country act to receive the award.

Discography

Albums

Extended plays

Singles

Music videos

References

External links
 Official website

Country pop duos
English country music groups
British country singers
Twin musical duos
Female musical duos